Kandiaro Tehsil (Tehsil) is an administrative subdivision of Naushahro Feroze District in Sindh province, Pakistan. Administratively Tehsil Kandiaro is subdivided into 1 Town Committee and 16 Union Councils and is headquartered at the city of Kandiaro. In terms of revenue administration this Tehsil is divided in 3 Supervisory Tapedar Circles, 18 Tapas and 52 Dehs.

Population
322,439 (Pakistan Census 2017)

Town Committee
1. TC Kandiaro

Union councils
1. UC Bhorti
2. UC Dabhro
3. UC Detha
4. UC Ghanghra
5. UC Ghullam Shah
6. UC Jam Noorullah
7. UC Kamal Dero
8. UC Kandhar
9. UC Khanwahan
10. UC Koro Khushk
11. UC Manjuth
12. UC Mohbat Dero Jatoi
13. UC Mohbat Dero Siyal
14. UC Moria
15. UC Shaikhani
16. UC Soomar Chanar

List of Dehs

References

External links
PDF Map of Kandiaro
www.pbscensus.gov.pk (PDF)

 
Talukas of Sindh
Tehsils of Sindh